Golubitsky or Golubitskiy (Ukrainian: Голубицький, Russian: Голубицкий) is a Slavic masculine surname, its feminine counterpart is Golubitskaya or Goloubitskaia. It may refer to

Marty Golubitsky (born 1945), American mathematician 
Pavel Golubitsky (1845–1911), Russian telephony engineer 
Sergei Golubitsky (born 1969), Ukrainian fencer
Sergey Golubitskiy (born 1962), Russian linguist, writer, journalist and financial analyst
 (born 1980), pianist and music teacher, living in Austria.

Russian-language surnames
Ukrainian-language surnames